Windermere is a suburb of the City of Maitland local government area in the Hunter Region of New South Wales, Australia, approximately  from the Maitland CBD. It is named after the Windermere estate.

References 

Suburbs of Maitland, New South Wales